The Lugela valley is a valley in the country of Georgia formed by the Khobistsqali  river. It is known for mineral waters and contains the Shuru Ghumu (Always Dark in the Megrelian language), the 3rd largest cave in the Caucasus. The valley has various recreational sites including picnic sites and swimming holes.

The nearby village of Ganarjiis Mukhuri is used by visitors to the valley and has a hotel.

References

Valleys of Georgia (country)